Vincent's bush squirrel (Paraxerus vincenti) is a species of rodent in the family Sciuridae, named in honour of Jack Vincent. It is endemic to Mozambique.  Its natural habitat is subtropical or tropical moist montane forests, and it is threatened by habitat loss.

References

Further reading
 
 
 

Mammals of Mozambique
Paraxerus
Endemic fauna of Mozambique
Mammals described in 1950
Taxonomy articles created by Polbot